"Tameiki" (Sigh) is Jun Shibata's 6th single and first recut. It was released on May 8, 2003 and peaked at #43.

Track listing
Tameiki (ため息; Sigh)
Yume (夢; Dream)

Charts

External links
http://www.shibatajun.com — Shibata Jun Official Website

2003 singles
Jun Shibata songs
2003 songs